Erivan Province may refer to:
 Erivan Province (Safavid Iran) (1502–1736), a province of the Safavid dynasty of Iran centered on the modern country of Armenia
 Erivan Khanate (1747–1828), a province of the Afsharid, Zand and Qajar dynasties of Iran centered on the modern country of Armenia
 Erivan Governorate (1850–1917), a province of the Russian Empire centered on the modern country of Armenia